Lintneria lugens is a moth of the  family Sphingidae.

Distribution 
It is known from Mexico, Honduras and Nicaragua.

Description 
It is similar to Lintneria eremitus, but larger. There are small black spots on the pale abdomen underside. The forewing upperside is blackish grey and there are two narrow, faint median bands on the forewing underside.

Biology 
There is one generation per year with adults on wing from July to September.

The larvae feed on Wigandia urens.

References

External links
Life Cycle Description

Lintneria
Moths described in 1856
Sphingidae of South America
Moths of South America